The first USS Yarnall (DD–143) was a  in the United States Navy during World War I later transferred to the Royal Navy as HMS Lincoln, to the Royal Norwegian Navy as HNoMS Lincoln, and subsequently to the Soviet Navy as Druzhny.

Construction and career

United States Navy service 

Named for John Yarnall, she was laid down on 12 February 1918 at Philadelphia by William Cramp & Sons Ship & Engine Building Company. The destroyer was launched on 19 June 1918; sponsored by Mrs. Marie H. Bagley. The ship was commissioned on 29 November 1918, Commander William F. Halsey, Jr., in command.

Assigned to Division 15, Destroyer Force, Yarnall served briefly with United States naval forces in France during 1919. By 1 January 1920, her division had been reassigned to Flotilla 5, Destroyer Squadron 4, Pacific Fleet, and operated out of the San Diego destroyer base. Her division—redesignated Division 13 in February—received orders in April to proceed to the Asiatic station; but she apparently did not begin that assignment until late the following fall. Yarnall returned from the Far East to the United States late in the summer of 1921 and began repairs at Puget Sound. In December, she was reassigned to Division 11 and again operated out of San Diego until 29 May 1922 when she was decommissioned there and placed in reserve.

After almost eight years of inactivity, the destroyer was recommissioned at San Diego on 19 April 1930, Comdr. John F. McClain in command. Assigned initially to Division 11, Squadron 10, Battle Fleet Destroyer Squadrons, Yarnall operated briefly on the west coast before being transferred to the east coast sometime late in 1930. By New Year's Day, 1931, her home port had been changed to Charleston, South Carolina. In March, she joined the Scouting Force under the command of Lt. Comdr. Thomas R. Cooley as a unit of Destroyer Division 3 but retained Charleston as her home port. The destroyer operated out of that base until late in the summer of 1934 when, though still a unit of Scouting Force Destroyers, she returned to the west coast. Based at San Diego, the warship remained active along the California coast until late in 1936. She then returned to the east coast and, on 30 December 1936, was placed out of commission at Philadelphia and berthed there with the reserve fleet.

As a part of President Franklin D. Roosevelt's program to bolster the minuscule Atlantic Squadron after war broke out in Europe in September 1939, Yarnall ended her 21-month, second retirement on 4 October 1939 when she was recommissioned at Philadelphia, Lt. Comdr. John G. Winn in command. She became a unit of Destroyer Squadron 11 of the Atlantic Squadron, the small fleet assigned the enormous task of keeping war out of the western hemisphere. She operated out of Norfolk in the Neutrality Patrol until the fall of 1940 when the United States concluded the destroyers-for-bases deal with the United Kingdom. Yarnall was stricken from the United States Navy list on 8 January 1941 — soon after her transfer to the Royal Navy.

Royal Navy service 

Yarnall was one of the 50 elderly destroyers chosen to be transferred to the Royal Navy in return for the right to establish American bases on British territory in the western hemisphere. She sailed to St. John's, Newfoundland, where she was decommissioned by the United States Navy on 23 October 1940; and, that same day, the Royal Navy commissioned her as Town-class destroyer HMS Lincoln (pennant number "G 42"), Comdr. G. B. Sayer, RN, in command.

The veteran destroyer departed St. John's on 3 November and arrived in Belfast, Northern Ireland, on 9 November. Lincoln moved from there to Londonderry Port where she was assigned to the First Escort Group, Western Approaches Command. For almost a year, she met troop transport and cargo convoys in mid-ocean and escorted them into ports in the British Isles. Between September 1941 and February 1942, the destroyer was refitted at Woolwich Dockyard. Lincoln was modified for trade convoy escort service by removal of three of the original 4"/50 caliber guns and one of the triple torpedo tube mounts to reduce topside weight for additional depth charge stowage and installation of Hedgehog.

Royal Norwegian Navy service 

After the refit, she was transferred to the exiled Royal Norwegian Navy as HNoMS Lincoln and served with the Western Local Escort Force, operating along the Newfoundland coast between Halifax, Nova Scotia and St. John's.  In July 1942, HNoMS Lincoln was loaned to the Royal Canadian Navy, though remaining under Norwegian colours. Her duty in Canadian waters continued until the end of 1943, when she returned to Britain departing Halifax on 19 December and arriving back in Londonderry Port on Christmas Day. Early in 1944, the venerable warship was placed in reserve in the River Tyne. Her service to the Allied cause, however, had not quite ended.

Soviet Navy service 

On 26 August 1944, she was transferred to the Soviet Navy and renamed Druzhny (rus. Дружный, "Friendly"). There is some disagreement on her career in the Soviet Navy. Western sources indicate she was cannibalized to provide spare parts for eight sister ships provided to the Soviet Union in late 1944; one Russian source indicates she was used on active duty from 23 September 1944 until the end of the war, and was returned in August 1952 to Britain where she was sold for scrap.

Notes

References

External links

 navsource.org: USS Yarnall
 hazegray.org: USS Yarnall
 
 U-boat.net: Dostojnyj

 

Wickes-class destroyers
Ships built by William Cramp & Sons
1918 ships
Town-class destroyers of the Royal Navy
Town-class destroyers converted from Wickes-class destroyers
World War II destroyers of the United Kingdom
Town-class destroyers of the Royal Norwegian Navy
World War II destroyers of Norway
Town-class destroyers of the Soviet Navy
World War II destroyers of the Soviet Union